= Gynopedia =

Gynopedia is a nonprofit organization that runs an open resource wiki for sexual, reproductive and women's health care around the world. The website was founded by Lani Fried in 2016. The main topics discussed on the site include access to contraception, emergency contraception, testing for sexually transmitted diseases, medications, menstrual products, gynecologists, pregnancy, abortion, counseling services, women's resources and LGBTQ resources. As of November 2017, the website covers nearly 100 cities.

Gynopedia is a primarily English-language website, but volunteer translators have begun translating pages into other languages, such as French.
